Gauntlet Legends is an arcade game released in 1998 by Atari Games and Midway Games.  It is a fantasy themed hack and slash styled dungeon crawl game, a sequel to 1985's popular Gauntlet and 1986's Gauntlet II and marks the final game in the series to be produced by Atari Games.  Its unusual features for an arcade game included passwords and characters that could be saved, enabling players to play over the course of a long period.

The game was given an expansion called Gauntlet Dark Legacy, which featured new characters to play and new levels.

Gameplay
In ages past, a corrupt mage named Garm used a set of Runestones to summon a demon named Skorne. However, Skorne crushed Garm and imprisoned his soul in the Underworld. Skorne, fearing the power of the Runestones, scattered them throughout the four realms, so that they could never be used against him. The player(s) must defeat the end bosses of each of the four kingdoms to obtain the four keys which allow access to the desecrated temple and be able to banish Skorne to the Underworld. While traveling through each realm, they must also collect the Thirteen Runestones from where they have been scattered. The complete set of Runestones allows them to pursue Skorne to the Underworld in order to finally destroy him. The players must find three rune stones on each kingdom in order to defeat Skorne in the Underworld (in the arcades only), and of course one from the battle grounds (home versions only). The initial arcade version had a contest by which the first 500 players to complete the game and send in the supplied validation code would win a free Gauntlet Legends shirt. This game will not end unless the player runs out of health.

A new aspect of the Gauntlet series is established in Legends: the ability to level up the player's character(s) as the game is played, increasing their abilities through experience earned by slaying enemies and acquiring treasure, similar to the character progression methods in many role-playing video games.  The four primary attributes are:
Strength - Determines damage dealt by physical attacks.
Speed - Determines character movement and attack rates.
Armor - Determines amount of damage character takes from enemy attacks.
Magic - Determines the range and effectiveness of magic potion attacks

Attributes increase with each level attained; increases can also be purchased from the Items menu with gold acquired in gameplay.

The stock fantasy characters from the original Gauntlet return for Legends; as before, each has greater starting ability in a single attribute than their fellows.
Warrior/Minotaur - Strength
Wizard/Jackal/Sumner - Magic
Archer/Tigress - Speed
Valkyrie/Falconess - Armor

Character progression is saved through a password system; a player can progress all four characters to a maximum level of 99, and each of their attributes to a maximum of 999.

Ports
The first home console port of Gauntlet Legends was released for the Nintendo 64 on August 31, 1999 in North America. This port saw a European release by the end of the year, and it was the exclusive platform for the Japanese release in the following year. It can support up to four players by using the Expansion Pak, or up to three when using the standard Jumper Pak. It requires a Controller Pak to save game progress, and it is compatible with the Rumble Pak.

Though it was originally planned to be released in 1999 alongside the Nintendo 64 version, the PlayStation port was released in 2000 for North America and Europe. Unlike the other versions, this release only supports one or two players, as it omitted multitap support.

The Dreamcast port was also released in 2000 for North America and Europe. It incorporated much of the features from Gauntlet Dark Legacy.

Reception
In Japan, Game Machine listed Gauntlet Legends on their March 1, 1999 issue as being the sixth most-successful dedicated arcade game of the month.

Greg Orlando reviewed the Dreamcast version of the game for Next Generation, rating it three stars out of five: "Four controllers and one Legends make for party-game excitement of the highest order".

Gauntlet Legends has received average reviews on all ports and releases. According to GameRankings, Gauntlet Legends received a 73.55% for the Dreamcast version, a 71.13% for the N64 version, and a 60.44% for the PlayStation version; for the same version, Metacritic only gave it a score of 59 out of 100.

References

External links

1998 video games
Arcade video games
Atari arcade games
Cooperative video games
Hack and slash role-playing games
Dreamcast games
Midway video games
Nintendo 64 games
PlayStation (console) games
Video games about valkyries
Video games scored by Barry Leitch
Video games featuring female protagonists
Video games developed in the United States
Multiplayer and single-player video games